John Proctor Gray (1 December 1840 – 20 April 1914) was an English-born Australian politician. Born in York, he was educated in England and became a business manager. In 1889 he migrated to Australia, becoming a businessman in Sydney. He unsuccessfully contested the first federal election as a Free Trade Party candidate for the Senate in New South Wales, but was successful in 1903. He held the seat until his defeat in 1910. After leaving politics, Gray became the chairman of the family company, a position he held until his death in 1914.

References

Free Trade Party members of the Parliament of Australia
Commonwealth Liberal Party members of the Parliament of Australia
Members of the Australian Senate for New South Wales
Members of the Australian Senate
1840 births
1914 deaths
20th-century Australian politicians
English emigrants to Australia